Tom Cannon was the ring name for a British professional wrestler and World Heavyweight Champion who was active in the early portion of the 20th century, but whose actual name is lost to history.

Championships and accomplishments
 Professional Wrestling
European Greco-Roman Heavyweight Championship
World Greco-Roman Heavyweight Championship
World Mixed Style Heavyweight Championship
International Professional Wrestling Hall of Fame (Class of 2022)

References

External links
 

1852 births
People from Tyldesley
British catch wrestlers
English male professional wrestlers
Year of death missing
Sportspeople from Greater Manchester